David R. Clements was a member of the Wisconsin State Assembly during the 1873 and 1874 sessions. Additionally, he was a sheriff and a town board (similar to city council) chairman. He was a Republican. Clements was born on December 14, 1819, in Pinckney, New York. Clements died on September 18, 1884, in Stevens Point, Wisconsin.

References

People from Lewis County, New York
People from Stevens Point, Wisconsin
Republican Party members of the Wisconsin State Assembly
Wisconsin city council members
Wisconsin sheriffs
1819 births
1884 deaths
19th-century American politicians